John Keith Dunstan  (3 February 1925 – 11 September 2013), known as Keith Dunstan, was an Australian journalist and author. He was a prolific writer and the author of more than 35 books.

Early life
Dunstan was born in East Malvern, Victoria, the son of journalist and Victoria Cross recipient, William Dunstan, and his wife Marjorie. He attended Melbourne Grammar School and Geelong Grammar School and was a flight lieutenant in the Royal Australian Air Force from 1943 to 1946, stationed at Labuan in the Pacific.

Journalism
In 1946 Dunstan joined The Herald and Weekly Times Ltd, publishers of The Sun News-Pictorial and The Herald (since merged as the Herald Sun). He was Foreign Correspondent for the H&WT with posts in New York (1949–52) and London (1952–54). This period was followed by a position with The Courier-Mail for which he wrote a column "Day by Day". He returned to Melbourne and from 1958 to 1978 contributed a daily column, "A Place in the Sun" for The Sun News-Pictorial, the city's largest circulating daily newspaper. During these years his popularity grew and he became a Melbourne institution.

From 1962 he wrote regularly for the Sydney-based weekly magazine The Bulletin under the pseudonym of Batman (after the city's controversial founder, John Batman) and for the travel magazine Walkabout. In 1976 and 1977 he was president of the Melbourne Press Club,  succeeding Rohan Rivett. He was the United States West Coast Correspondent (1979–82) for the Herald and Weekly Times. Later, he was a regular columnist and occasional contributor to The Age newspaper.

Author
He published a quartet of books on Australian character: Wowsers (1968), Knockers  (1972), Sports (1973) and Ratbags (1979) and many works of history on popular subjects ranging from wine to sport to retailing, and including an unfashionably critical study of the Australian outlaw Ned Kelly, Saint Ned (1980). His pioneering works of Australian sports history included The Paddock That Grew (1962) on the Melbourne Cricket Ground, which has now seen several editions and updates. He also wrote an autobiography, No Brains at All (1990).  Other publications included The Melbourne I Remember (2004) and Moonee Ponds to Broadway (2006), a study of his friend and fellow Melburnian, the satirist Barry Humphries.

Other activities
In 1967 he became founding secretary of the Anti-Football League, a tongue-in-cheek organisation that pokes fun at the Australian rules football obsession.

An enthusiastic commuter and recreational cyclist, he was the first president of the Bicycle Institute of Victoria (now known as  Bicycle Network) from its founding in 1974 to 1978. He was a bicycle touring enthusiast who with his wife Marie cycled across the United States in the 1970s and through China in the 1980s.

Whilst living on Victoria's Mornington Peninsula he was an enthusiastic grower and maker of pinot noir wine.

Honours and awards
In the 2002 Australia Day Honours, Dunstan was awarded a Medal of the Order of Australia (OAM) "for service as a journalist and author, and to the community, particularly as a supporter of the Berry Street Babies Home".

On 26 May 2009, he became Patron of the Prahran Mechanics' Institute.

On 11 October 2013, Dunstan was posthumously inducted into the Melbourne Press Club's Victorian Media Hall of Fame. He was told of his forthcoming induction before his death.

Personal life
He was married to Marie (daughter of Charles McFadyen), and they had four children. Dunstan died of cancer on 11 September 2013. Dunstan's son, David, reported that his father had written his own, self-effacing, obituary.<ref name="ABC">"Columnist Keith Dunstan dies of cancer aged 88", ABC website', 13 September 2013. Retrieved 12 October 2013.</ref>

 Books 
 1853-2003, Victoria Police Australia : celebrating 150 years in the community, foreword by Christine Nixon; introduction; editor, Marilyn Miller Melbourne : Victoria Police, 2003
 A cricket dictionary; illustrated by Jeff Hook, c. 1983
 A Day in the life of Australia : the complete collection of his Age column, [compiled by] South Melbourne : Macmillan Australia, 1989
 Above Australia : a salute to our cities, photography by Leo Meier; text ... [et al.] by Meier, Leo, 1951- McMahons Point, N.S.W. : Weldons, 1985
 Batman in the Bulletin : the Melbourne I remember; with a foreword by Barry Humphries; selected and edited by David Dunstan Melbourne : Australian Scholarly Publishing, 2004
 Bowls - the lawn bowls dictionary; illustrated by Jeff Hook South Melbourne : Sun Books, 1986
 Bundy : a centenary history, <Bundaberg, Qld.> : Bundaberg Distilling Company Pty. Ltd., (1988)
 Collins : the story of Australia's premier street, Judith Raphael Buckrich; with Keith Dunstan, Rohan Storey & Marc Strizic by Buckrich, Judith Raphael, 1950- Melbourne : Australian Scholarly Publishing, c2005
 Flag, the first 30 years : the growth and experiences of the hospitality industry in Australasia, South Melbourne : Flag International, 1991
 Footy, an Aussie rules dictionary; illustrated by Jeff Hook Melbourne : Sun Books, 1983
 Gurney & Bluey & Curley : Alex Gurney and his greatest cartoons, John Gurney with by Gurney, Alex, 1902-1955 South Melbourne : Macmillan Company of Australia, 1986
 Health and fitness : the dictionary; illustrated by Jeff Hook South Melbourne : Sun Books, 1985
 Hook, line and sinker : the dictionary; illustrated by Jeff Hook South Melbourne : Sun Books, 1986
 Informed sources : a history of the Melbourne Press Club 1971-2001, [Melbourne] : Melbourne Press Club, 2001
 It's all up hill, and Jeff Melbourne : Pegasus Books, 1979
 Just Jeans : the story 1970-1995, Kew, Vic. : Australian Scholarly Pub., 1995
 Kiwi : the Australian brand that brought a shine to the world : a history of the Kiwi Polish Company; about this book, Hamish Ramsey; [foreword by] Geoffrey... Crows Nest NSW : Allen & Unwin, 2017
 Knockers, North Melbourne, Vic. : Cassell, 1972
 Make friends for Australia, Melbourne : Australian Tourist Commission, [1979?]
 Moomba, the first 25 years, Melbourne : Sun News-Pictorial and Melbourne Moomba Festival, 1979
 Moonee Ponds to Broadway, [Melbourne, Vic.] : Australian Postal Corporation, 2006
 My life with the demon, Melbourne : Wilkinson Books, 1994
 No brains at all : an autobiography, Ringwood, Vic. : Viking, 1990
 No brains on Tuesday : the collected wit & wisdom of Keith Dunstan, Melbourne : Schwartz & Wilkinson, c1991
 Not a bad drop - Brown Brothers, Kew, Vic. : Australian Scholarly Publishing, 1999
 Racing : the horse-racing dictionary; illustrated by Jeff Hook Melbourne : Sun Books, 1985
 Ratbags; foreword by Barry Humphries Sydney : Golden Press, 1979
 Saint Ned : the story of the near sanctification of an Australian outlaw, Sydney : Methuen Australia, 1980
 Skiing, the skiing dictionary; illustrated by Jeff Hook South Melbourne : Sun Books, 1987
 Sports, with a foreword by Max Harris, Melbourne : Sun Books
 Supporting a column Melbourne, London, Cassell, 1966
 Tennis : a tennis dictionary; illustrated by Jeff Hook South Melbourne : Sun Books, 1984
 The amber nectar : a celebration of beer and brewing in Australia, Ringwood, Vic. : Viking O'Neil, 1987
 The Australian uppercrust book, ... [and others]. Edited by Geoffrey Dutton and Lee White South Melbourne : Sun Books, 1971
 The confessions of a bicycle nut, Melbourne : Information Australia, 1999
 The paddock that grew : the story of the Melbourne Cricket Club; research by Hugh Field London : Cassell, 1962
 The people's ground : the MCG, Kew, Vic. : Australian Scholarly Publishing, 2000
 The perfect cup : the story of coffee, Keith Dunstan, Sue Fairlie-Cuninghame Balmain, N.S.W. : David Ell Press for Andronicus, 1989
 The store on the hill, Melbourne : Macmillan, 1979
 The tapestry story : celebrating 150 years of the Melbourne cricket ground, written; illustrations by Robert Ingpen South Melbourne : Lothian Books, 2003
 Two old geezers tell you about bridge, the A-Z, Keith Dunstan, Geoff Hook Melbourne : Wilkinson Publishing, 2011
 Wine, the wine dictionary; illustrated by Jeff Hook Melbourne : Sun Books, 1985
 Wowsers; being an account of the prudery exhibited by certain outstanding men and women in such matters as drinking, smoking, prostitution, censorship and gambling'', Melbourne : Cassell Australia, 1968

References

External links
Keith Dunstan articles at The National Times

1925 births
2013 deaths
Australian columnists
Australian humorists
Australian memoirists
Royal Australian Air Force personnel of World War II
Deaths from cancer in Victoria (Australia)
Journalists from Melbourne
People educated at Geelong Grammar School
Recipients of the Medal of the Order of Australia
Royal Australian Air Force officers
People from Malvern, Victoria
People educated at Melbourne Grammar School
Military personnel from Melbourne